Liu Fendou (born 1969, Beijing) is a Chinese film director, screenwriter and film producer.

Biography 
Born in Beijing, Liu Fendou spent some time in the United States in his youth doing "generally doing a whole lot of nothing" until returning to Beijing in 1995.

Upon his return to China, Liu entered into the film world, and soon became a major figure in China's independent film scene. Beginning his career as a screenwriter collaborating with Zhang Yang in his films Spicy Love Soup, and Shower, and Shi Runjiu in Beautiful New World, Liu eventually moved on to founding his own independent production company, Electric Orange Entertainment, which helped finance and produce Zhang Yibai's debut film Spring Subway.

In 2004, Liu released his directorial debut, the comedy-drama Green Hat. It was followed by the release of Ocean Flame, produced by Simon Yam Tat-wah, in 2008.

Filmography

As screenwriter

As director

As producer

References

External links

Liu Fendou at the Chinese Movie Database

1969 births
Living people
Film directors from Beijing
Chinese film producers
Screenwriters from Beijing